Qasrok is a town located in the Shekhan District of the Ninawa Governorate in northern Iraq. Qasrok's residents are mostly Kurds with a small Assyrian minority. 

The town and the surrounding villages were demolished and later recolonized by Arabs during the late 1960s. Most of the Arabs, however, returned to their original settlements after 2003.

History 
A number of the town's village's, such as Badariyah, Bajilla, Malla-Birwan, and Kifre, were settled by Assyrians from the Tkhuma tribe and were destroyed during the Simele massacre.

References 
Basic information about Shekhan District, Christian Aid Program in Iraq

Populated places in Nineveh Governorate
Assyrian communities in Iraq
Kurdish settlements in Iraq
Nineveh Plains